= Iraq Institute for Strategic Studies =

Iraqi research institute

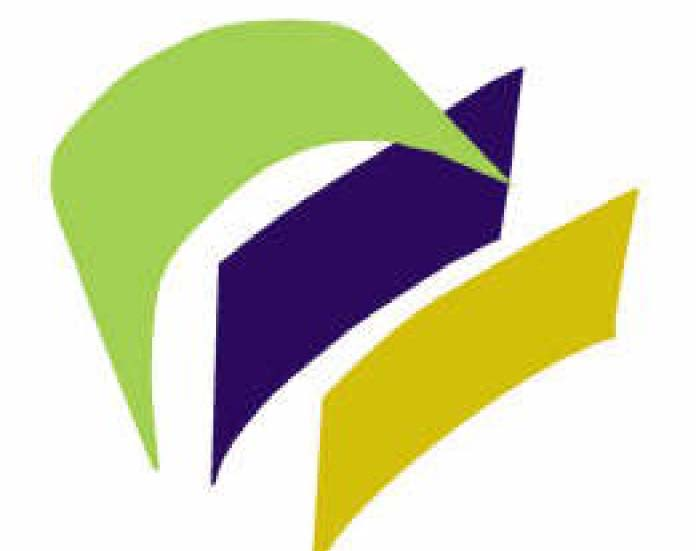
- Abbreviation: IIST
- Type: think tank
- Headquarters: Beirut, Lebanon
- Director: Faleh A Jabar
- Website: www.iraqstudies.com

The Iraq Institute for Strategic Studies is an Iraqi research institute focusing on political, socio-economic, religious, and gender issues in Iraq.

== Overview ==
IIST was founded in London, England in 1993 as The Iraqi Cultural Forum (ICF), a research group that organized academic conferences and seminars to study Iraq and the wider Middle East. The ICF was initiated by a host of London-Paris based Iraqi scholars and writers, supported by Birkbeck College and the School of Oriental and African Studies (SOAS) of London University.

After the 2003 demise of the Ba'ath regime, the ICF made the decision to move to its native land, Iraq. It was renamed, the Iraqi Institute for Strategic Studies (IIST).

== Training ==
The Major Training Courses for 2010-2011 included Young Researchers, Media, Women's Rights, Women NGOs, Management, and Leadership I and II, and Public Integrity I and II.

== Board of Directors & Governors ==
- Faleh A. Jabar (Director)
- Saad Abdul Razzaq (Vice Director)
- Robert Sheena (Secretary)
- Adnan Hussain
- Amir Hasan
- Eden Naby
- Sheerzad Najjar
- Wathab al-Sadi
